In the law of Brazil, the writ of security is a remedy used to protect individual rights.

References

Brazilian legislation
Security